Takata may refer to:

 Takata Corporation, an automotive parts company based in Japan
 Takata District, Hiroshima, a district located in Hiroshima Prefecture, Japan
 Takata, Fukuoka, a town located in Miike District, Fukuoka Prefecture, Japan
 Rikuzen-Takata Station, a JR East railway station located in Rikuzen-Takata, Iwate Prefecture, Japan

People with the surname
, Japanese speed skater
 Hawayo Takata (1900–1980), Japanese-American who helped introduce the spiritual practice of Reiki to the Western World
 Mayuko Takata (born 1971), Japanese actress
 Princess Takata (674–728), Japanese princess during the Asuka period and Nara period of Japanese history
 Taylor Takata (born 1982), American athlete
 Yasuma Takata (1883–1972), sociologist and economist

 Mashiho Takata (born 2001), Japanese member of South Korean boyband TREASURE

Fictional people
 Hideko Takata, a fictional geophysicist from Marvel Comics

See also 
 Takata Station (disambiguation)
 Tacata (disambiguation)
 Takada (disambiguation)

Japanese-language surnames